The 1979 NCAA Skiing Championships were contested at the Steamboat Ski Resort on Mount Werner near Steamboat Springs, Colorado, at the 26th annual NCAA-sanctioned ski tournament to determine the individual and team national champions of men's collegiate alpine, cross-country skiing, and ski jumping in the United States.

Seven-time defending champions Colorado, coached by Tim Hinderman, once again claimed the team national championship, finishing 23 points ahead of Utah in the standings. This was the tenth title for the Buffaloes.

Venue

This year's NCAA skiing championships were contested at the Steamboat Ski Resort at Mount Werner in Steamboat Springs, Colorado. 

These were the eighth championships held in the state of Colorado (1956, 1959, 1966, 1968, 1969, 1972, 1975, and 1977) and the third at Steamboat Springs (1968 and 1969).

Team scoring

See also
List of NCAA skiing programs

References

NCAA Skiing Championships
NCAA Skiing Championships
NCAA Skiing Championships
NCAA Skiing Championships
NCAA Skiing Championships
NCAA Skiing Championships
NCAA Skiing Championships
Skiing in Colorado